The women's discus throw event at the 1995 Summer Universiade was held on 31 August at the Hakatanomori Athletic Stadium in Fukuoka, Japan.

Results

References

Athletics at the 1995 Summer Universiade
1995 in women's athletics
1995